Jet Set Satellite is a Canadian rock band based in Winnipeg, Manitoba.

History
Jet Set Satellite was founded in 1998 by singer/guitarist Trevor Tuminski and multi-instrumentalist/producer Dave Swiecicki. The pair released their debut album "Blueprint" in March 2000, via Nettwerk Records.

Touring with three hired musicians, the duo celebrated two Top 20 Canadian hit singles, "Best Way to Die" and "Baby, Cool Your Jets", at rock radio, and tie-in videos that received regular rotation on MuchMusic and MTV Europe that year. Guitarist Mike Keller would soon become a member and, in 2001, bass player Tery Kazakoff and drummer Rich Reid were added to the group's lineup.

In 2003, Tuminski and Swiecicki exercised an escape clause in their contract with Nettwerk so that the five band members could work on a second album with more creative freedom. During this time, Jet Set Satellite's music appeared in various media, including feature films "American Outlaws" and "Soul Survivors," and video game EA Sports' NHL 2002.

By mid-2004, the band would also part ways with Kazakoff, before releasing an independent follow-up to "Blueprint", entitled "Vegas," on October 25, 2005, and distributed by Fusion 3. The title track (for which there is also a music video), "Together," "Remover" and "Please Capture Me" were released as radio singles. The band toured independently throughout 2005 and 2006 to promote "Vegas," adding bass player Jay Rink to the fold by the end of the album's promotional campaign. "Together" was featured in the season finale of TV's ER and an episode of TV's "Tru Calling," "Belonging" was synchronized in a made-for-TV movie titled "Grizzly Rage," and "Among the Living" was featured in a TV show called "Johnny Zero."

In August 2008, Jet Set Satellite released its third album, "End of an Era," distributed by Storming The Base. The songs "Ladykiller" and "Black.Heart.Burn" were released as singles (including a video for the former) and would be the extent of the album's promotion as the band went on hiatus by late 2008.

In 2013, after more than four years of silence, members of Jet Set Satellite released a rewrite of its hit single "Baby, Cool Your Jets," in honour of the return of the NHL to Winnipeg, called "Baby, Fuel Your Jets."

In late 2014, the band issued a digital-only, limited-time-only release of rarities and previously unreleased material called "Ashes From the Fire."

The songs "Ladykiller" and "Black.Heart.Burn" appeared in numerous episodes of Guillermo del Toro's FX TV series "The Strain" as the sound of the character of Bolivar's band.

Band members:
Trevor Tuminski - vocals, guitar (1998–present)
Dave "Bulldog" Swiecicki - keyboards, guitar, percussion, production (1998–present)
Mike Keller - lead guitar (2000–present)
Rich Reid - drums (2001–present)
Jay Rink - bass guitar (2006–present)
Tery Kazakoff - bass guitar (2001-2004)

Discography
Blueprint - 2000, Nettwerk Records
 Lies by the Thousands
 Best Way to Die
 The Night it Went Too Far
 Blueprint
 The Goodbye Letter
 Baby, Cool Your Jets
 After the Rain
 Tinfoil Star
 Afterglow
 Suddenly
  
Vegas - 2005, Independent
 The Slow Descent
 Holding On and Never Letting Go
 Vegas
 We're Above This
 Together
 Belonging
 Remover
 Among the Living
 Please Capture Me
 Walk Away
 Invisible Words
 I'm What You Need

End Of An Era - 2008, Independent
 The Beast
 Ladykiller
 Black.Heart.Burn
 Resurrexit
 You and I
 XOXO (You Can't Go)
 If Not Now Never
 This Is Not a Come On
 By the Dark of Night
 Children of the Grave
 The Mark

References

External links
Band MySpace Page
Street Team MySpace Page
JetSetSatelliteTV

Canadian rock music groups
Musical groups from Winnipeg
Musical groups established in 1998
1998 establishments in Manitoba